Stari Brod   is a village in Croatia. It is connected by the D36 highway.

Populated places in Sisak-Moslavina County